Morachi Chincholi, by name itself means a village of tamarind trees (Marathi:chincha) and town of dancing peacocks (Marathi:  moar) all around.  It is situated near Pune-Ahmednagar Highway about 55 km from Pune.  Even today one can find a lot of peafowls in the village.

Morachi Chincholi, alluring places entrenched in rural Maharashtra yet quite close for a pleasure trip from Pune. There are enormous activities at morachi chincholi which includes bullock cart rides, tractor rides, hurda parties, children park, rural games, bird watching, kandil nights, nursery, outdoor games, camping and tent facilities. It also includes kids park, magic show, puppet show and other livestock. All activities revolve around pollution and noise free environment. They have a committee of observant  members that will take care of you beyond your expectations.

Morachi Chincholi showcases a true ideal Indian village with all traditional culture. Peacocks at this place are somewhat used to locals living in the village but are shy to tourists. Morachi Chincholi means a village of dancing peacocks.

As you interact with people here, it's quite evident why the national bird enjoys special status at Chincholi Morachi. In this village, the peacock is not just protected, but also revered - so much so that this is one place where its numbers have steadily increased over the years.

This village gives you a true feel of Indian countryside! As the veil of darkness lifted from Chincholi Morachi, heralding a new day, it was life as usual for the villagers. The hurly-burly of daily life had begun in the non-descript village.

Peacock is the national bird of India. It is a large and brightly colored bird of the pheasant family native to South Asia, but introduced and semi-feral in many other parts of the world. Morachi Chincholi Bird Sanctuary also makes for a great getaway from the maddening rush of the city; the place is just so serene and beautiful that you would wish to stay a bit longer each time you visit here.

It is said that during the Peshwe dynasty many tamarind trees were planted and these attracted peafowls. The villagers also claim that their ancestors kept planting tamarind trees and cohabited with this bird. Now there are around 2500 peafowls in this region.

It is Gram Panchayat in Shirur Tahsil and Ashok Thakuji Gorde is Sarpanch from 24 February 2021. Rahul Nanekar is up-Sarpanch.

Getting there
From Pune, take the Ahmednagar Highway (SH 22), then turn left  onto SH 54 just after Shikrapur at Malthan Phata. After passing Ganegaon and Varude, you will get into Morachi Chincholi.

Attractions
While peafowls can be seen roaming the fields throughout the day, they are best observed early in the morning or in the early evening. Some of the resorts have built special viewing areas that allow viewing the peafowl from a distance. Getting too close startles them, causing them to run away.

References

Villages in Pune district
Tourism in Maharashtra